Rho Octantis, Latinized from ρ Octantis, is a star located in the southern circumpolar constellation  Octans. With an apparent magnitude of 5.57, its faintly visible to the naked eye under ideal conditions.

Rho Octantis has a classification of A1/2 V, which states its a star with the traits of an A1 and A2 main-sequence star. It has nearly twice the mass of the Sun, and has a radius of 2.19 solar radii. Like many A-type stars, Rho Octantis rotates rapidly, with a projected rotational velocity of 128 km/s; it is 431 million years old. Rho Octantis has a common proper motion K0 companion 65.7” away.

References

Octantis, ρ
Octantis, 24
076996
5729
137333
A-type main-sequence stars
Durchmusterung objects
Octans